= Carlos I =

Carlos I may refer to:

- Carlos I of Spain (1500–1558), also Charles V of the Holy Roman Empire
- Carlos I of Portugal (1863–1908), King of Portugal
- Juan Carlos I of Spain (born 1938), King of Spain
